A lead frame (pronounced  ) is a metal structure inside a chip package that carries signals from the die to the outside, used in DIP, QFP and other packages where connections to the chip are made on its edges.

The lead frame consists of a central die pad, where the die is placed, surrounded by leads, metal conductors leading away from the die to the outside world. The end of each lead closest to the die ends in a bond pad. Small bond wires connect the die to each bond pad. Mechanical connections fix all these parts into a rigid structure, which makes the whole lead frame easy to handle automatically.

Manufacturing

Lead frames are manufactured by removing material from a flat plate of copper, copper-alloy, or iron-nickel alloy like alloy 42. Two processes used for this are etching (suitable for high density of leads), or stamping (suitable for low density of leads). The mechanical bending process can be applied after both techniques.

The die is glued or soldered to the die pad inside the lead frame, and then bond wires are attached between the die and the bond pads to connect the die to the leads. In a process called encapsulation, a plastic case is moulded around the lead frame and die, exposing only the leads. The leads are cut off outside the plastic body and any exposed supporting structures are cut away. The external leads are then bent to the desired shape.

Uses

Amongst others, lead frames are used to manufacture a quad flat no-leads package (QFN), a quad flat package (QFP), or a dual in-line package (DIP).

See also
 Chip carrier – Chip packaging and package types list

References

Chip carriers